Gərgər (also, Gərkər, Gər-gər, and Gerger) is a village and municipality in the Gadabay Rayon of Azerbaijan.  It has a population of 2,201.  The municipality consists of the villages of Gərgər, Yenikənd, and Qarikənd.

References 

 

Populated places in Gadabay District